Zeitgeist ("Spirit of the Age") is the debut album by German electronic DJ Schiller. It features the singles "Das Glockenspiel", "Liebesschmerz" and "Ruhe", all of which reached the top 30 of the German singles charts. The album itself reached the top 30 of the German longplay charts as well.

Track listing
All tracks by Von Deylen and Von Schlieffen

References

External links 
 discogs.com

1999 debut albums
Trance albums
Schiller (band) albums